In comics, Puppet Master may refer to:

 Puppet Master (Marvel Comics), a Marvel Comics supervillain
 Puppeteer (comics), a DC Comics supervillain formerly called Puppet Master
 Puppet Master (Eternity Comics), a comic book series based on the horror film franchise Puppet Master
 Puppet Master (Action Lab Comics)

See also
Puppeteer (disambiguation)